Cyathocalyx zeylanicus is a plant species within the genus Cyathocalyx of the family Annonaceae. It is endemic to Western Ghats and Sri Lanka.

References

Further reading

Annonaceae
Taxa named by Joseph Dalton Hooker